Charles-Arthur Dumoulin Cannon (11 September 1905 – 23 September 1976) was a Liberal party member of the House of Commons of Canada. He was a lawyer by career.

He was first elected at the Îles-de-la-Madeleine riding in the 1949 general election. Cannon was re-elected for successive terms there in 1953 and 1957. After completing his final term, the 23rd Canadian Parliament, Cannon was defeated by James Russell Keays of the Progressive Conservative party.

Some of Cannon's relatives have also been Members of Parliament, namely his grandfather Charles Fitzpatrick, his uncle Lucien Cannon and his nephew Lawrence Cannon.

References 
 

1905 births
1976 deaths
Charles
Members of the House of Commons of Canada from Quebec
Lawyers in Quebec
Liberal Party of Canada MPs
Politicians from Quebec City
Quebec people of Irish descent
Quebecers of French descent
20th-century Canadian lawyers